Riverside College (formerly known as Halton College) is a further education college based over two sites in the Widnes, Cheshire, England. It was rated "Outstanding" by Ofsted following an inspection in 2020.

The college was established from the merger of Halton College and Widnes & Runcorn Sixth Form College in 2006. Today, Riverside College has two campuses in Widnes: one, the more academically focused Cronton Campus, situated on Cronton Lane in the north of the town; and the more vocationally focused Riverside Campus, situated on Kingsway nearer to the town centre.

The college provides a range of courses, including GCSEs, A Levels, BTECs, Apprenticeships and Access courses. In addition, the college offers some higher education courses, in conjunction with Pearson Education and Staffordshire University.

References

External links

 Riverside College homepage

Education in the Borough of Halton
Further education colleges in Cheshire
Educational institutions established in 2006
2006 establishments in England